Henry Repeating Arms is a firearms manufacturing company. As of 2019, Henry Repeating Arms ranked in the top five of U.S. long gun manufacturers, and eighth overall in total firearms production, manufacturing over 300,000 firearms annually.

History 
Henry Repeating Arms was started by Louis Imperato and his son Anthony Imperato in Brooklyn, New York in 1996. The first model produced was the Henry H001 Lever-Action .22 and the first shipments were made in March 1997. The original corporate motto was "Made in America and Priced Right". Henry Repeating Arms takes its name from Benjamin Tyler Henry, the inventor who patented the first repeating rifle in 1860, known as the Henry rifle. There is no affiliation or lineage to Benjamin Tyler Henry or to the New Haven Arms Company, who sold the original Henry rifle from 1862 to 1864. Anthony Imperato secured the trademark to the Henry name in 1996.

Operations 
Henry Repeating Arms employs over 600 people and operates three manufacturing facilities totaling more than 350,000 square feet. The company headquarters is located in Rice Lake, Wisconsin, and the other factories are in Bayonne, New Jersey, and Ladysmith, Wisconsin. Louis Imperato served as Chairman of the company from its start in 1996 until his passing in November 2007. Anthony Imperato currently serves as the CEO and Founder, and Andy Wickstrom is the company President.

Products 

Henry Repeating Arms manufactures rifles and shotguns. The company produces a broad range of lever-action rifles in both rimfire and centerfire calibers, in a variety of finishes, including alloy, steel, hardened brass, hardened silver, color case hardened, and All-Weather. The company’s signature model is the Henry Golden Boy, a rimfire lever-action whose moniker is "the gun that brings out the west in you". The company has sold over one million of its model H001 Lever-Action .22 rifle, which has become a staple of the firearms industry. The company donated serial number 1 million which was auctioned and raised over $50,000. The Henry Big Boy is a centerfire lever-action that is suitable for brush hunting, home defense, and cowboy action shooting. The Henry Long Ranger is a centerfire lever-action that delivers bolt-action distance and precision for big game hunts. The Henry US Survival AR-7 is an updated version of the U.S. Air Force AR-7, a semiautomatic take-down .22LR designed so that all of the rifle's components fit into the buttstock. The Henry Mini Bolt is a beginner's stainless steel single-shot .22 rifle that is the official youth rifle of the USA Shooting Team. Henry Repeating Arms is the official firearms licensee of the Boy Scouts of America, and several Henry Boy Scout editions are available. The company has a line of tribute rifles, honoring many deserving constituencies including those serving in the military, first responders, and the American Farmer. The Henry Corporate Editions program offers companies the opportunity to place their logo on a Henry rifle for employee retirements, dealer rewards, and corporate milestones. The Henry Single Shot Shotgun is available in hardened brass or steel in 12 and 20 gauge, and .410 caliber. The Henry Single Shot rifle is also available in hardened brass or steel in over 10 centerfire calibers. Henry Repeating Arms released the Side-Gate lever-action rifle chambered in .30-30 Win, .38-55 Win, .35 Rem, and .45-70 Gov't in 2018. This is their first rifle to feature a loading gate allowing ammo to be loaded, reloaded, or topped off as needed from the rear of the tubular magazine. The gun can be unloaded quickly from the muzzle end of the tubular magazine.

Promotion 
Henry Repeating Arms' corporate motto is "Made In America Or Not Made At All".

Awards 

Henry Repeating Arms was recognized for exceptional customer service in June 2016 by the American Business Awards and received the Stevie Award for both Customer Service and Social Media. It is the only time a firearms company has received these awards.

Events 
Henry Repeating Arms held the record-breaking Henry 1,000-Man Shoot in November 2016 at Ben Avery Shooting Center when 1,000 participants fired Henry Golden Boy rifles simultaneously.

Charitable endeavors 
Guns For Great Causes is the charitable arm of Henry Repeating Arms. Its primary focus is on pediatric cancer - providing financial relief to families of sick children and donations to children’s cancer hospitals. In addition, Guns For Great Causes benefits military veterans, law enforcement, and first responder organizations, particularly those assisting the wounded, injured, and the families of those who lost their lives in the line of duty. Wildlife conservation, preserving and promoting America’s shooting sports traditions, firearm safety education, and 2nd Amendment advocacy are all additional beneficiaries of Henry’s Guns for Great Causes program. 100% of all Guns For Great Causes firearms sales are donated. Since its inception, Henry Repeating Arms has donated over $3.5 million through Guns For Great Causes endeavors.

References

External links
 

Bayonne, New Jersey
Firearm manufacturers of the United States
Companies based in Hudson County, New Jersey